The French National Mountain Bike Championships are held annually to decide the cycling champions in the mountain biking discipline, across various categories.

Men

Cross-country

Elite

Under-23

Juniors

Cross-country eliminator

E-Bike Cross-country

Marathon

Downhill

Elite

Juniors

Trials

Beach race

Four cross

Women

Cross-country

Elite

Under-23

Juniors

Cross-country eliminator

E-Bike Cross-coutry

Marathon

Downhill

Elite

Juniors

Trials

Beach race

See also
French National Road Race Championships
French National Time Trial Championships
French National Cyclo-cross Championships

References

Cycle races in France
Recurring sporting events established in 1992
1992 establishments in France
National mountain bike championships
Mountain biking events in France